Balonne was an electoral district of the Legislative Assembly in the Australian state of Queensland from 1873 to 1932, and again from 1950 to 1992. It was named after the Balonne River.

Balonne was generally centered on the inland rural towns of St George and Dirranbandi.

Balonne was abolished in the 1991 redistribution, and was distributed between the new electorate of Western Downs and the existing district of Warrego.

Members for Balonne

Election results

See also
 Electoral districts of Queensland
 Members of the Queensland Legislative Assembly by year
 :Category:Members of the Queensland Legislative Assembly by name

References

Former electoral districts of Queensland
1873 establishments in Australia
1932 disestablishments in Australia
1950 establishments in Australia
1992 disestablishments in Australia